is a Japanese mystery horror novel by Koji Suzuki first published in 1991, and set in modern-day Japan. The novel was the first in the Ring novel series, and the first of a trilogy, along with two sequels: Spiral (1995) and Loop (1998). The original Ring novel sold 500,000 copies by January 1998, and 1.5million copies by July 2000. Ring was the basis for the Ring franchise, including a 1995 television film (Ring: Kanzenban), a 1998 theatrical film of the same name (Ring), a television series (Ring: The Final Chapter), and two international film remakes of the 1998 film: a South Korean version (The Ring Virus) and an English-language version (The Ring).

Plot synopsis 
After 4 teenagers mysteriously die simultaneously in Tokyo, Kazuyuki Asakawa, a reporter and uncle to one of the deceased, decides to launch his own personal investigation. His search leads him to "Hakone Pacific Land", a holiday resort where the youths were last seen together exactly one week before their deaths. Once there, he happens upon a mysterious unmarked videotape. Watching the tape, he witnesses a strange sequence of both abstract and realistic footage, including an image of an injured man, which ends with a warning revealing that the viewer has one week to live. Giving a single means of avoiding death, the tape's explanation ends suddenly, having been overwritten by an advertisement. The tape has a horrible mental effect on Asakawa, and he does not doubt for a second that its warning is true.

Returning to Tokyo with no idea how to avert his fate, Asakawa enlists the help of his curious friend Ryūji Takayama, an apparent psychopath who openly jests that he engages in rape. As soon as Asakawa explains the story, Ryūji believes him and insists on seeing the tape. Asakawa shows it to him, and he agrees that there is a powerful aura around it, and asks Asakawa to make him a copy to study at home, which Asakawa does.

Racing against the deadline, both men begin investigating the tape. By following the imagery from the tape, Ryūji deduces that the rapid strobe seen during certain sequences show the recording device was "blinking". The duo then connects this, as well as the significance of certain tape images, with Sadako Yamamura, a young woman capable of technopathic feats (such as projecting mental images onto televisions) who mysteriously vanished 30 years previously. Believing that Sadako is connected to the tape, Asakawa also soon learns that, after carelessly leaving the tape in his home, his wife and infant daughter viewed the tape and now have 1 week to live.

Learning of an isolated sanatorium Sadako frequented when her father contracted tuberculosis, Asakawa arranges a meeting with Nagao Jotaro, a doctor at the now-closed hospital. Recognizing him as the injured man from the tape sequences, Ryūji aggressively presses Dr. Jotaro for answers; the doctor, buckling under pressure, explains that he was infatuated with Sadako and raped her in the woods near the hospital. Infecting her with smallpox that he unknowingly contracted, Jotaro was injured during a struggle (during which he learned Sadako was intersex), resulting in the doctor throwing Sadako into a nearby well before crushing her with rocks.

Believing that Sadako's rage and psychic powers resulted in the images projected onto the tape, Asakawa and Ryūji head for the well where she was killed. Figuring that the well is located beneath the lodge where the tape was located, the duo locates the well. Asakawa lowers himself inside, finding Sadako's remains. Recovering and giving her remains a burial, Asakawa passes his deadline, confirming that his curse has ended. When Ryūji dies of a heart attack the next day, however, the true nature of the tapes are revealed: Sadako's rage caused her psychic powers to combine with the smallpox virus in her body, creating a paranormal phenomenon that is activated when the tape is viewed. Demanding the viewer replicate the tape, the curse is propagated like a virus through tape copies, sparing anyone who copies it; since Asakawa duplicated the tape at Ryūji's request, he now must make his wife and daughter do the same.

Characters
 Kazuyuki Asakawa: The book's protagonist, he is a Tokyo newspaper reporter whose reputation was somewhat tarnished in the past in connection with a fad for UFOs and ghosts. He has a wife, Shizuka (the Vertical, Inc. English translation of the novel incorrectly renders her name as Shizu), and daughter, Yoko.
 Ryuji Takayama: Asakawa's friend whom he enlists to help him solve the riddle of the tape. He was a doctor but later became a philosophy professor of a famous university due to the time the story occurred. Being of an odd mental disposition, and is also something of a genius, Ryūji usually stated that the purpose of his life is to gaze at the end of humanity. Ryūji also claims to be a rapist, although whether these claims are true or not is unclear, as it may be a hoax used to befriend the quiet Asakawa. He was actually a lonely person who struggled to live peacefully within society. Ryūji has even more significant roles in the sequels Spiral and Loop.
 Shizuka and Yoko Asakawa: Asakawa's wife and daughter respectively. When Shizuka unknowingly watches the cursed video with Yoko on her lap, they become Asakawa's primary motivation for solving the riddle of the tape.
 Sadako Yamamura: The book's unseen antagonist who vanished thirty years ago and is also the person behind the incident of the cursed tape. She was, in fact, intersex with special powers similar to ESP. She was said to be extremely beautiful.
 Shizuko Yamamura: Sadako's mother, who possessed powers similar to her daughter's. She threw herself into the crater of Mt. Mihara after a demonstration of telepathy, which she failed due to the present reporters' ill wishes, and was branded a fraud.

Adaptations
After the publication of the book several adaptations were made, including a manga adaptation of the novel which was released in 1996 by Kouhirou Nagai. In 1999, a second manga was made by Misao Inagaki which took elements from the novel, film and television versions of the Ring.

Films
Ring: Kanzenban (1995)
Ring (1998)
The Ring Virus (1999)
The Ring (2002)

TV Series
Ring: The Final Chapter (1999)

Manga
Ring (1996)
Ring (2 volumes) (1999)

Audio Dramas
Ring (1996)
Ring (2015)

References

External links
 Vertical Inc. - publisher of English translations of the Ring novels.
SaruDama - contains reviews of Ring and other Suzuki novels.

1990s horror novels
1991 novels
Japanese horror novels
Japanese novels adapted into films
Novels by Koji Suzuki
Novels set in Tokyo
The Ring (franchise)
Vertical (publisher) titles
Books with cover art by Chip Kidd